Wildcat Stadium is a 5,000-seat multi-purpose stadium opened in 1981 in Destrehan, Louisiana. It is home to the Destrehan High School Fighting Wildcats football, soccer and track and field teams in the LHSAA. The stadium playing surface is FieldTurf with an all-weather running track surrounding the field.

In addition to the Destrehan High School athletic teams, the stadium hosts the annual Ed Reed River Parishes football jamboree games and the annual Ed Reed football camp. The St. Charles Parish School Board and Recreation Department also utilizes the facility for multiple athletic events.

Gallery

Fighting Wildcats Field House
The Fighting Wildcats Field House opened in 1981 is adjacent to the football stadium. It houses the coaches’ offices, locker rooms, meeting room, weight room, equipment room and athletic training facilities. The training room features hydrotherapy which includes hot/cold jacuzzis and multiple stations to treat players. The athletic training staff is also housed in the building.

Fighting Wildcats Field House gallery

Fighting Wildcats Football Practice Complex
The Fighting Wildcats Football Practice Complex is adjacent to the Field House and consists of two practice fields. A lighted practice field and a special teams practice field located next to the main practice field. The practice field is also used for javelin events during LHSAA track and field meets and by the Fighting Wildcats track and field team.

Fighting Wildcats Football Practice Complex gallery

See also
Destrehan High School

External links
Destrehan High School website

References

American football venues in New Orleans
Athletics (track and field) venues in New Orleans
High school football venues in Louisiana
Multi-purpose stadiums in the United States
Soccer venues in New Orleans
Buildings and structures in St. Charles Parish, Louisiana
Sports venues completed in 1981
1981 establishments in Louisiana